Durran Durra is a locality in the Queanbeyan–Palerang Regional Council, New South Wales, Australia. It is located on the road from Braidwood to Nowra about 15 km north of Braidwood and 100 km east of Canberra. It consists mainly of grazing country.

The area now known as Durran Durra lies on the traditional lands of the Walbanga people, a group of the Yuin.

In 1827, James Ryrie took up land in the area. James died in 1840 and his property was consolidated with the nearby Ryrie family property, Arnprior, at neighbouring Larbert.

Durran Durra had a "half-time" school from 1872 to 1898, from 1904 to 1905 and from 1915 to 1921.

References

Localities in New South Wales
Queanbeyan–Palerang Regional Council
Southern Tablelands